The meridian 85° east of Greenwich is a line of longitude that extends from the North Pole across the Arctic Ocean, Asia, the Indian Ocean, the Southern Ocean, and Antarctica to the South Pole.

The 85th meridian east forms a great circle with the 95th meridian west.

From Pole to Pole
Starting at the North Pole and heading south to the South Pole, the 85th meridian east passes through:

{| class="wikitable plainrowheaders"
! scope="col" width="120" | Co-ordinates
! scope="col" | Country, territory or sea
! scope="col" | Notes
|-
| style="background:#b0e0e6;" | 
! scope="row" style="background:#b0e0e6;" | Arctic Ocean
| style="background:#b0e0e6;" |
|-
| style="background:#b0e0e6;" | 
! scope="row" style="background:#b0e0e6;" | Kara Sea
| style="background:#b0e0e6;" |
|-
| 
! scope="row" | 
| Krasnoyarsk Krai — Plavnikovyye Islands
|-
| style="background:#b0e0e6;" | 
! scope="row" style="background:#b0e0e6;" | Kara Sea
| style="background:#b0e0e6;" |
|-valign="top"
| 
! scope="row" | 
| Krasnoyarsk Krai Yamalo-Nenets Autonomous Okrug — from  Krasnoyarsk Krai — from  Yamalo-Nenets Autonomous Okrug — from  Krasnoyarsk Krai — from  Khanty-Mansi Autonomous Okrug — from  Krasnoyarsk Krai — from  Tomsk Oblast — from  Kemerovo Oblast — from  Novosibirsk Oblast — from  Kemerovo Oblast — from  Novosibirsk Oblast — from  Altai Krai — from  Altai Republic — from 
|-
| 
! scope="row" | 
| For about 6 km
|-
| 
! scope="row" | 
| Altai Republic — for about 11 km
|-
| 
! scope="row" | 
|
|-valign="top"
| 
! scope="row" | 
| Xinjiang Tibet — from 
|-
| 
! scope="row" | 
|
|-valign="top"
| 
! scope="row" | 
| Bihar Jharkhand — from  Odisha — from  Jharkhand — from  Odisha — from 
|-
| style="background:#b0e0e6;" | 
! scope="row" style="background:#b0e0e6;" | Indian Ocean
| style="background:#b0e0e6;" |
|-
| style="background:#b0e0e6;" | 
! scope="row" style="background:#b0e0e6;" | Southern Ocean
| style="background:#b0e0e6;" |
|-
| 
! scope="row" | Antarctica
| Australian Antarctic Territory, claimed by 
|-
|}

See also
84th meridian east
86th meridian east
Eighty Five East Ridge

e085 meridian east